Pictou—Antigonish—Guysborough was a federal electoral district in the province of Nova Scotia, Canada, that was represented in the House of Commons of Canada from 1997 to 2004.

This riding was created in 1996 from Cape Breton Highlands—Canso and Central Nova ridings, and consisted of the counties of Pictou, Antigonish and Guysborough. It was abolished in 2003 when it was redistributed into Cape Breton—Canso and Central Nova ridings.

Its only member was Peter G. MacKay from the Progressive Conservative Party of Canada.

Members of Parliament

This riding elected the following Members of Parliament:

Election results

See also 

 List of Canadian federal electoral districts
 Past Canadian electoral districts

External links 
 Riding history for Pictou—Antigonish—Guysborough (1996–2003) from the Library of Parliament

Former federal electoral districts of Nova Scotia